Digos City National High School (DiCNHS), formerly known as Davao del Sur National High School, is situated at Rizal Avenue, Zone II, Digos, is one of the biggest school in Davao Region, under the jurisdiction of the DepEd Division of Digos. Digos City National High School is also once the second largest secondary school in the country in terms of student population, second only to Rizal National High School in Pasig. Founded in August 1946 with the name of Digos Junior High school.

History
Digos City National High School (DICNHS) was founded in August, 1946. It was originally named Digos Junior High School. It started with just two humble nipa huts at Rizal Avenue, Digos, Davao del Sur. The school principal, then, was the late Crispin Tolentino. There were only nine teachers to help him guide the 250 students from 1946 to 1967. Two years later, the name was changed to Digos Provincial High School.

From 1968 to 1975, the school principal was the late Federico Alferez. The school had 4,760 students, 249 teachers and employees. After twenty-nine years of hard work, perseverance and determination on the part of the administrator, the enrollment tremendously increase and later the name of the school was changed to Davao del Sur National High School specifically in 1970. At that time, there was an assistant principal, 8 department heads and guidance coordinator.

Mr. Ramon C. Presto became the school principal from 1976 to 1997 with 7,118 students, 252 teachers and seventeen employees until he died in 1997. Mr. Alfonso G. Gomez, Jr., CESO V, Schools Division Superintendent of Davao del Sur took over and acted as Officer-in-Charge of the school from 1997 to August 12, 1998 with 7,973 students, 252 teachers and 17 employees.

On August 13, 1998, Dr. Concepcion R. Cadungog, former Education Supervisor in Mathematics and Assistant to the Schools Division Superintendent, Division of Davao del Sur took over from Mr. Alfonso G. Gomez, Jr. as Secondary School Principal IV with 12,110 students, 263 teachers and 18 employees.

Digos City Ordinance No. 05- II changed the name of Davao del Sur National High School into Digos City National High School last November 10, 2005. The ordinance is known as the Digos City National High Ordinance authored by City Councilor Josef F. Cagas and City Councilor Atty. Vic P. Cadungog, co-authored by all members of the Sangguniang Panlungsod of Digos attested by then Vice-Mayor Atty. Joseph Peňas and approved by the then Digos Mayor, Atty. Arsenio A. Latasa.

Vision
The Digos National High School shall produce students who are academically equipped, technologically competitive and morally upright towards building a progressive society in cooperation with the community.
The Digos City National High School shall produce students who are academically equipped, technologically competitive and morally upright towards building a progressive society in cooperation with the community.

Mission
The Digos City National High School provides quality instruction, programs, projects and activities to prepare the students to face the challenges of the new millennium.

Goals
Curriculum Goal
To provide a curriculum which extends and supports students through appropriate teaching and learning programs.

Learning Environment Goal
To develop conducive learning environment where mutual respect is demonstrated among students, teachers, parents and community.

Staff Management Goal
To implement school management policies and practices that support efficient and effective administration, staff professional development and effective decision-making.

Resources Management Goal
To develop, maintain and allocate physical and financial resources in line with the goals and improvement areas of the school.

Community Building Goal
To establish mutual beneficial relationship with parents and the community based on shared trust and participation.

Academic programs

Basic education curriculum
This is a regular curriculum with special features for students whose needs are preparation for higher learning and gainful employment.

The four year curriculum builds on Basic Education Curriculum (BEC) with Technical vocational Education (TLE) as the core of the program. Opportunities for students to "earn-while-you-learn" shall be explored in this program. The use of Information and Communication Technology (ICT) to enhance teaching and learning shall be encouraged.

The BEC also provides special classes/sections for students whose final grades are not less than 85%, called Pilot classes.

Subjects taken by the students in the General Curriculum:

Science Technology Engineering and Mathematics (STEM)
The program has an enriched Science, Mathematics and English curriculum in addition to the standard requirements of the secondary education curriculum.

It provides additional enrichment material for Science and Technology, Mathematics and Earth Science.

Incoming first year students in Science Network Classes are required to pass OLSAT Aptitude and Ability Test and Personality Test.

They must maintain a final grade of not less than 80% in all subjects.

Subjects taken by ESEP students:

Special Program in the Arts (SPA)
The program provides special curriculum offerings for the development of talents and interest in visual arts, creative writing in English and Filipino, music, theatre arts, dance arts in addition to the standard requirements of the secondary education curriculum.

Special Program in the Arts envisions an excellent young artist with aesthetic potential and renewed spiritually committed to the preservation of Filipino Culture and heritage. Its objective is to develop students with special inclination to music, visual arts, theatre arts, creative writing, media arts and dance.

It is a nationwide program for students with potential or talents in the arts, namely, Music, Visual Arts, Theatre Arts, Media Arts, Creative Writing and Dance.

Special Education (SPED) Program
The program provides activities for students who are visually impaired, hearing impaired, mentally retarded, autistic or orthopedically handicapped and fast learners.

Special Program in Sports (SPS)
Special Program in Sports (SPS) is in line with the efforts of the Department of Education to institutionalize a program that will identify/discover students with potential talent in sports and hone their skills for higher levels of athletic competitions.

Special Program in Foreign Language (SPFL) Spanish and Chinese Mandarin
The Special Program in Foreign Language is for schools whose students have demonstrated competence in English and are capable of learning another foreign language. In this school, it is given to the pilot section every grade level, one section for Spanish and another section for Chinese Mandarin.

Open High School Program
This program aims to provide alternative mode of delivering secondary education. It puts premium on independent, self-pacing and flexible study to reach learners who are unable to start or complete secondary education due to problem of time, distance, education design, physical impairment, financial difficulties or family problems.

The Open High School Program is learner-centered and makes use of a wide range of teaching/learning strategies through combination of print and non-print media.

Non-Formal Education (NFE) or Alternative Learning System (ALS)
This program offers alternative learning opportunities for the out of school youth and adults specifically those who are 15 years and above and unable to avail themselves of the educational services and programs of the formal education. It reaches out to citizens of varied interest, demographic, characteristics and socio-economic origins and status.

Its primary objective is to provide literacy programs to eradicate illiteracy.

Student service program and facilities
In line with its objectives of developing a well-rounded personality of Digos City National High School, the school maintains the following facilities and implements the following services:

Guidance Services
Formal guidance counseling services as well as informal guidance counseling are provided to the students through frequent, cordial and simulating contacts. Programs are provided to
direct and assist the students in their academic, spiritual and moral, emotional/psychological,
social, career likewise with personal and impersonal relationship.

Library Services
Books in the library are available on open shelves. Students can use them freely. Books should be returned to their respective shelves after use.

The school library is located in the second floor of the Multi-Media Center near the HE Building and Food Court. It is open daily from Monday to Sunday from 8:00 am to 5:00 pm to cater the services to the students of the Daily Class Program and Open High School Program (OHSP).

Prefect of Discipline
This Office is directly in charge of discipline. The coordinator and members are responsible for the discipline of students and investigation of violation of school rules and regulations. They recommend penalties to the Principal.

The Office of the Prefect of Discipline is adjacent to the Guidance Office and near to the Administration Office.

Health Services
To promote good health and well-being of the students, the school provides first aid in emergency cases.

The Clinic is maintained by one full-time nurse and part-time assistants who are available to attend to the health needs of the students. Free medicines and first aid treatments are provided in the clinic.

The school clinic is located in the main building near the School Centrex and Mathematics department office.

Computer Laboratory
The computer laboratories are located on the second floor of the Science Building, School Centrex, HE Building, Library and Multi-Media Room.

These laboratories provide services to the students during their classes in computer and in the computer-aided instruction.

Food Services
Good nutrition is essential to student’s growth, development and achievement. The school canteen provides these services. It serves the food and nutritional needs of the students like snacks, lunch, breakfast, and school supplies. The students are also provided the opportunity of developing desirable food habits and social behavior.

The school canteen is located near the Science Building, HE Building and Multi-Media Center.

The school canteen also serves as a laboratory for Home Economics, retail trade and in the incidental teaching of health and nutrition. It provides hands-on training for students on planning, purchasing, handling and storage, preparation, serving and sale on safe and nutritious meals.

Science Laboratories
Science Laboratories provide services both for Science teachers and students to help facilitate the learning of Science and Technology courses. They provide laboratory facilities that would create proper atmosphere conductive for science investigation and in the preparation, distribution and the
use of science equipment and supplies in their demonstration class, individual or group experiments and projects.

The science laboratories are located in the following venues:
A. DOST Building near the Security Guard House for Physics Laboratory and Research/ Advance Chemistry Laboratory.
B. Main Building near the Science Department Office and Filipino Department for Chemistry Laboratory and Science I Laboratory.
C. Science Building Near the school canteen for Biology Laboratory.

TLE Laboratories
These laboratories provide services to the students in TLE classes in the four curricular areas:
Home Economics
Agriculture
Industrial Arts
Entrepreneurship

Values Formation Center
To enrich the classroom experiences and to develop n the students the desired values and attitudes as persons, the campus ministries in the different religious sectors provide services for
worshiping and living. To attain these goals, they conduct prayer sessions, class formation, Eucharistic celebration, meditations and readings of magazine, bible and pamphlets in the Meditation
Garden located at the back of the left wing of the main building

Digos City National High School Marching Band - Bacoor Festival 2016 National Marching Showband Champion Girl Scouts of the Philippines (GSP) 

 Commission on Elections and Appointments (ComEA) Chairwoman:Ellah Michelle AntonioScreening and Validation Commissioner:Ellah Michelle AntonioElectoral Commissioner:Leigh Marvin EmphasisAppointment Commissioner:Zhairelle FlorentinoGrievance Commissioner:Sophia Bajalla

 League of Engineering and Science Students (LESS) 

Is an organization exclusively only for the STEM students to enhance more of their capability.
The first ever LESS Science and Research Congress was held on March 7, 2014 at Gaisano Grand Mall Digos.

RecentsPresident: Louiel Jay ConcepcionVice-president: Kia EncantoSecretary: Sybyl OrbudaTreasurer: Ellysa PilapilAsst. treasurer: Louiel ConcepcionAuditor: Denise ArmamentoPIO: Carlo AngBuss. Mng. Kenneth EltagondeRepresentatives,Grade 10: Heart ManapolGrade 9: Dorothy BaloGrade 8: Lily CagasGrade 7: Sofia Macasaet

Campus PressPublicationsAng Bagong Landas
Ang Bagong Landas is the official publication of the Digos City National High School for Filipino. It has received a lot awards not only locally but also regionally and nationally. The current editor-in-chief is Irl Dean Cobias, and the incumbent advisers are Mrs. Fe Jumalin and Mr. Ramon Gravino.Patnugot sa Editoryal Irl Dean CobiasPatnugot sa Lathalain Allysa OropelPatnugot sa Agham at Teknolohiya Sofia LicuananPatnugot sa Isports Christian MaravillasTagakuha ng Larawan Aireen Revilla

The Pioneer
The Pioneer is the official publication of the Digos City National High School for English. Just like Landas, it has also received many awards and recognition from highly respected award giving bodies here in the region and in the country. The current editor-in-chief is Sybyl D. Orbuda, and the incumbent advisers are Mrs. Rosela Angelo and Ms. Kristine Diamante.News Writer-Ellysa Kaye PilapilSports Writer- Carylle Maxine BurlazaEditorial Writer- Louiel Jay ConcepcionSci-Tech Writer- Kernel Emerson RaquelCopy Reader and Headline Writer- Smith BascoPhotojournalist- Timothy QuipitCartoonist- Jasper PacanaLayout Artist- Carlo AngRadio Broadcasting- Pherl John Siares, Kia Encanto, Denise Armamento, Audrey Peig, Elce Manguilimotan, Maria Recopuerto, Justine Heart Gealon

Sigaw Juan (Filipino)
 Anchors: John Carl Aparicio
 Talents: Odysa Estrada (2nd Best News Presenter NSPC 2017/infomercial), Ramadinah Beruar(News/Informercial), Christian Maravillas (Sports/Infomercial)
 Time Keeper: Jubilee Lanticse
 Technical Director: Iren Doceo
 Stage Director: Gene Kyle Sardido

Echoes 11 (English)
 Anchor: Dennis Jr. Manguilimotan 
 Talents: Ken Paolo Catubig, Jeanette Rivera, Maxene Kyla Olaer
 Time Keeper: Save Mart Mondejar 
 Technical Director: Ethel Marti Senato 
 Stage Director:Collaborative Publishing'''

The Heralds
 Editor-in-Chief: Alfie Deyes
 Associate Editor: Zoella Mendoza
 News: Grace Helbig
 Features: Zea Anne Denise Go
 Sports: Danica Patrick
 Photography: Elouisse Gaile L. Abalayan and Gwendelyn Piquero
 Graphics Robin: Miriam Carlsson

References

Educational institutions established in 1946
Science high schools in the Philippines
High schools in the Philippines
Digos
Schools in Davao del Sur
1946 establishments in the Philippines